Liliana Corbu  (born ) is a retired Romanian female volleyball player.

She was part of the Romania women's national volleyball team.

She participated in the 1994 FIVB Volleyball Women's World Championship. On club level she played with Dacia Pitesti.

Clubs
 Dacia Pitesti (1994)

References

External links
cev.lu

1975 births
Living people
Romanian women's volleyball players
Place of birth missing (living people)